Kanawha County Schools is the operating school district within Kanawha County, West Virginia. It is governed by the Kanawha County Board of Education.

Board of education
The School Board is made up of five members, each elected to a four-year term in a nonpartisan election. The Board appoints the superintendent. Current members:

The Superintendent is Dr. Tom Williams

Budget
Kanawha County Schools faced a multimillion-dollar budget crisis for the FY 2012, but had overcome the issue in time. Superintendent Duerring stated that school officials'  two major goals, if the shortfall was to occur, is to maintain the current curriculum as much as possible, and not decrease employee wages or benefits.

The County Board of Education members are also paid $160 per meeting, and are not allowed to exceed 50 meetings in a school year or else they will not be paid.

Per Pupil Spending
For 2006-2007,Kanawha County spent $9,855 per pupil.  The state average was $9,611.

Academic performance

No Child Left Behind
For the 2008-2009 school year, Kanawha was ranked as being "Below AYP - Status
Needs Improvement in One Or More Accountability Cells." They did not meet AYP standards for 2008 or 2007 either.

Adequate Yearly Progress

WESTEST 2
WESTEST (West Virginia Educational Standards Test) 2 is defined by the WVDOE as "a custom-designed assessment for West Virginia students. The individual content assessments measure a student’s levels of performance on clearly defined standards and objectives and skills."

WESTEST 2/APTA Assessment (2008–09)

Unions
AFT-Kanawha Local 4444 is the locally chartered union of the American Federation of Teachers. AFT-Kanawha represents only teachers in Kanawha County. Fred Albert is the president of AFT Local 4444.
AFT-Kanawha is a local affiliate of AFT-West Virginia. All AFT local unions are affiliated with the National and WV AFL-CIO 

The West Virginia School Service Personnel (WVSSPA) represents school service personnel in Kanawha County Schools. School service personnel include non-administrative office employees, aides, custodians, transportation, maintenance, and school meal providers. WVSSPA is a chartered local of AFT-WV.

The Kanawha County Education Association (KCEA) is an association of school administrators and teachers for this school district. Dinah Adkins is the President. It is a local affiliate of the West Virginia Education Association.

School choice
West Virginia is one of 10 states that does not have a charter school law.

By written request from a parent or guardian, a superintendent may transfer students from one school in the district to another.  The county school board can also transfer students from one school district to another.

Schools

High schools
 Capital High School
 Herbert Hoover High School
 Nitro High School
 Riverside High School
 Sissonville High School
 South Charleston High School
 St. Albans High School
 George Washington High School

Middle schools
 John Adams Middle School
 Cedar Grove Middle School
 DuPont Middle School
 Dunbar Middle School
 East Bank Middle School
 Elkview Middle School
 Hayes Middle School
 Andrew Jackson Middle School
 West Side Middle School
 It is in the "West Side" neighborhood in Charleston. It was previously Stonewall Jackson Middle School and it occupies a facility that formerly housed high school grades. In 2020 an online petition to give the school what became its current name surfaced, and 6,500 signatures appeared. In July of that year all members of the school board voted to change the name.
 Horace Mann Middle School
 McKinley Middle School
 South Charleston Middle School
 Sissonville Middle School

Elementary schools
 Alban Elementary School
 Alum Creek Elementary School
 Andrews Heights Elementary School
 Anne Bailey Elementary School
 Belle Elementary School
 Bridge Elementary School
 Bridgeview Elementary School
 Cedar Grove Elementary School
 Central Elementary School
 Chamberlain Elementary School
 Chesapeake Elementary School
 Clendenin Elementary School
 Cross Lanes Elementary School
 Dunbar Primary School
 Dunbar Intermediate School
 Edgewood Elementary School
 Elk Elementary Center
 Flinn Elementary School
 Grandview Elementary School
 Holz Elementary School
 Kanawha City Elementary School
 Kenna Elementary School
 Lakewood Elementary School
 Malden Elementary School
 Marmet Elementary School
 Mary Ingles Elementary School
 Midland Trail Elementary School
 Montrose Elementary School
 Nitro Elementary School
 Overbrook Elementary School
 Piedmont Elementary School
 Pinch Elementary School
 Point Harmony Elementary School
 Pratt Elementary School
 Richmond Elementary School
 Ruffner Elementary School
 Ruthlawn Elementary School
 Sharon Dawes Elementary School
 Shoals Elementary School
 Sissonville Elementary School
 Mary C. Snow West Side Elementary School
 Weberwood Elementary School
 George C. Weimer Elementary School

Alternative schools
 Chandler Academy

Career and Technical
 Ben Franklin Vocational Center
 Carver Career Center
 Garnet Career Center

Former Schools

Former High Schools
 Booker T. Washington High School - Closed in 1956 when KCS was integrated and became Grant Junior High School, which closed in 1986.
 Clendenin High School (Clendenin, West Virginia) - Consolidated with Elkview High School to form Herbert Hoover High School in September 1963.
 Elkview High School (Elkview, West Virginia) - Consolidated with Clendenin High School in September 1963 to form Herbert Hoover High School.
 Cedar Grove High School (Cedar Grove, West Virginia) - Consolidated into DuPont High School, now Cedar Grove Middle/Elementary School.
 Charleston High School - Consolidated in 1989 with Stonewall Jackson into Capital.
 Dunbar High School - Consolidated into South Charleston HS in 1990.
 DuPont High School - Consolidated in 1999 with East Bank into Riverside, now DuPont Middle.
 East Bank High School - Consolidated in 1999 with Dupont into Riverside, now East Bank Middle.
 Garnet High School - Closed in 1956 when KCS was integrated, now serves as Garnet Career Center.
 Stonewall Jackson High School- Consolidated in 1989 with Charleston into Capital, now West Side Middle.

References

In surprising vote, Kanawha BOE names next superintendent

External links
 Official Website

School districts established in 1933
Education in Kanawha County, West Virginia
School districts in West Virginia
1933 establishments in West Virginia